State Route 736 (SR 736, OH 736) is a north–south state highway in the central portion of the U.S. state of Ohio. Its southern terminus is at U.S. Route 42 (US 42) near Plain City, and its northern terminus is at a T-intersection with SR 38 in Marysville.

Route description
SR 736 runs exclusively within Union County. Around 1,890 vehicles travel the road annually on average at the beginning of the route, and 2,220 near the end of the route.

SR 736 starts at US 42 near Plain City, and temporarily moves west, before moving northwest. The road continues in the same direction until its terminus at SR 38 in southwestern Marysville. The road passes through mostly farmland and private properties.

History
The route was originally designated in 1937 along the routing that it currently occupies between US 42 and SR 38, SR 736 has not experienced any significant changes to its routing since its debut.

Major intersections

References

736
Transportation in Union County, Ohio